Kadra Yosuf also known as Kadra Noor or Kadra Norwegian; (born 16 June 1980 in Somalia) is a Somali-Norwegian activist.

In 2000, she investigated female genital cutting in the Somali community in Norway.  Going undercover, she exposed the support of imams in Norway for the practice.  For her efforts, she received the Fritt Ord Honorary Award, but has since been living in hiding.

In April 2007 she called to reinterpret the Koran as far as it concerns Muslim women's rights. Several days later she was attacked by a group of Somali immigrants, both male and female, who shouted at her that she was trampling the Koran.

References

External links
Skartveit, Hanne. De som endrer liv [Those who change lives]. 26 December 2020. VG (newspaper)

1980 births
Living people
Norwegian Muslims
Norwegian activists
Norwegian women activists
Proponents of Islamic feminism
Norwegian people of Somali descent